The Supercopa de Baloncesto 2005 was disputed in Granada, Andalusia and begins with the following semifinals.

Semifinals
October 8, 2005:

Real Madrid 69 - 74  TAU Cerámica : (Official Match Recap)

Unicaja 71 - 73  CB Granada : (Official Match Recap)

Third and fourth place
October 9, 2005:

 Real Madrid 81 - 74  Unicaja: (Official Match Recap)

Final
October 9, 2005:

 TAU Cerámica 61 - 55  CB Granada: (Official Match Recap )

MVP: Luis Scola of TAU Cerámica

See also
 Supercopa de España de Baloncesto
 ACB

External links
 Official website

Supercopa de España de Baloncesto
2005–06 in Spanish basketball cups